The 2020 DFL-Supercup was the eleventh edition of the German super cup under the name DFL-Supercup, an annual football match contested by the winners of the previous season's Bundesliga and DFB-Pokal competitions. The match was played on 30 September 2020. The match is usually played in July or August prior to the start of the Bundesliga. However, due to postponement of the 2019–20 Bundesliga as a result of the COVID-19 pandemic, the start of the 2020–21 season was delayed until September 2020. Due to the COVID-19 pandemic, the match was played behind closed doors.

The match featured Bayern Munich, the champions of the 2019–20 Bundesliga and winners of the 2019–20 DFB-Pokal (completing a domestic double), and Borussia Dortmund, the runners-up of the Bundesliga and holders of the DFL-Supercup. The match was hosted by Bayern at the Allianz Arena in Munich. In a change of format, the Bundesliga champions hosted the DFL-Supercup, having previously been hosted by the winners of the DFB-Pokal, or the runners-up of the Bundesliga in the case of a team completing the double.

Bayern Munich won the match 3–2 for their eighth Supercup title. For the first time ever, a female referee was selected to officiate the match: German referee Bibiana Steinhaus, who directed the last match of her career.

Teams
In the following table, matches until 1996 were in the DFB-Supercup era, since 2010 were in the DFL-Supercup era.

Background
The match was the second German super cup to be held at the Allianz Arena (after 2012), and the third to take place in Munich (additionally in 1994 at the Olympiastadion).

Match

Details

See also
2019–20 Bundesliga
2019–20 DFB-Pokal

Notes

References

External links

2020
2020–21 in German football cups
FC Bayern Munich matches
Borussia Dortmund matches
Dfl-Supercup
Sports competitions in Munich
2020s in Munich